Peter McAulay AO QPM, born Ronald Peter McAulay, (30 November 1932 – 14 November 1995) was an Australian Federal Police (AFP) commissioner.

Peter McAulay at the age of 13 was Assistant Paymaster for General Motors Holden.  He joined the South Australia Police as a junior constable on 8 January 1951, graduating from the South Australia Police Academy in 1953.  He was made inspector in 1966, and in 1968 served in United Nations Peacekeeping Force in Cyprus (UNFICYP), ultimately acting as police advisor there in 1970, and leading a contingent of a multi-national police force.  He returned to the South Australian Police in 1972 and held executive roles, ultimately being promoted to Detective Chief Superintendent.  On 13 October 1978 he was appointed Commissioner of the Northern Territory Police.

He was appointed Commissioner of the Australian Federal Police in February 1988, and retired in June 1994.

He died from a respiratory illness on 14 November 1995 in Canberra, ACT.

Honours and awards

See also
Australian Federal Police
Law enforcement in Australia

References

Commissioners of the Australian Federal Police
1932 births
1995 deaths
Officers of the Order of Australia
People from Adelaide
Commissioners of the Northern Territory Police